The Battle of Tacuzcalco was a battle on 13 June 1524 fought between a Spanish army under the command of conquistador Pedro de Alvarado and Cuzcatlan fighters under Atlácatl.

Background 

In June 1524, Spanish conquistador Pedro de Alvarado embarked on an expedition into modern day El Salvador with the intention of conquering the land for the Spanish Empire. On 8 June 1524, Alvarado fought and defeated Cuzcatlan fighters under Atlácatl at the Battle of Acajutla.

Battle 

On 13 June 1524, Alvarado engaged Atlácatl in a second battle at Tacuzcalco. Atlácatl's army was larger than the army he commanded at Acajutla and Alvarado stated that seeing the size of Atlácatl's was "terrifying." Following the battle, Alvarado described the outcome as a "great massacre" and "punishment" of the Pipil warriors.

Aftermath 

After the defeat at the hands of the Spanish, the Pipil refused to engage the Spanish in open battle, instead resorting to guerrilla tactics to fight the Spanish. After further campaigning, Alvarado and his men returned to Guatemala in July 1524.

References

Bibliography 

History of El Salvador
Tacuzcalco
Tacuzcalco
Audencia of Guatemala
Pipil
Sonsonate Department
1524 in Central America